Swiss Sikhs are a small religious minority in Switzerland, numbering no more than 500, with four  gurdwaras. The number of Sikhs had been higher in the mid-1980s, caused by the presence of some 3,000 Sikh asylum seekers.

Gurdwaras
Gurdwara Sahib, Langenthal. This gurdwara, first begun in 1996, was finished in 2006. It is the first Sikh shrine in Switzerland built in the traditional Sikh style
Gurdwara Guru Nanak Sabha, Jean Antoine Gautier 11,1201 Geneva. http://www.sikhgurdwarageneva.ch/ 
Gurudwara Sikh Gemeinde Schweiz Däniken

Gurdwara Sahib Zürich, Vorbuchenstrasse 13, 8303 Bassersdorf Switzerland

References